Take Me in Your Arms may refer to:
 Take Me in Your Arms (Lil Suzy song)
 Take Me in Your Arms (Eddy Arnold song)
 Take Me in Your Arms (Rock Me a Little While), a song written by Holland–Dozier–Holland
 Take Me in Your Arms (film), a 1954 Mexican drama film